This article contains cast and character information for the ABS-CBN Filipino drama television series Magkaribal.

Main characters
Bea Alonzo as Angela "Gelai" Agustin / Angela Abella –  Angela is Anna’s younger sister. She loves designing since she was a kid; a passion that she shares with her sister. When she was kidnapped, she met a boy named Dos, later on known as Louie Villamor. She was found and adopted by a couple from Divisoria: Hermes Agustin, and his wife Sonia, a seamstress who recently lost a child. With a humble beginnings as a seamstress, she is currently a budding designer with dreams of becoming a top designer. Hand-in-hand with her desire to be a top designer, Gelai is also determined to find her older sister, Anna. Barbie Sabino plays the younger counterpart.
Gretchen Barretto as Anna Abella / Victoria Valera –  Anna is Angela's driven older sister who became a successful international model and designer. After losing her mother at the age of 15, from a fight with Vera, she worked as a prostitute in order for her and younger sister, Angela, to survive. However, she was separated from her younger sister, Angela, who she believed had died in a hospital fire. She was later found and adopted by a wealthy man named Ronaldo Valera and is renamed Victoria Valera. She wants revenge on Vera for contributing to her mother, and presumably, her sister's death. She has a complicated yet meaningless relationship with Louie. Kathryn Bernardo plays the younger counterpart.
Angel Aquino as Vera Cruz-Abella –  Chloe's adoptive mother, and the source of Anna and Angela’s resentment. As a young international model, she fell in love and had a relationship with Manuel Abella while in Italy. She blames Anna for her miscarriage, which resulted in her to be unable to have children of her own again. Years later, she becomes a designer determined to maintain her status as the “Queen of Philippine Fashion.” Vera then becomes sinister and angry at Victoria Valera, whom she sees as a threat to her reputation in the fashion industry. Alessandra De Rossi plays the younger counterpart.
Derek Ramsay as Louie “Dos / Markado” Villamor –  He was the boy who Gelai befriended and helped her escape from their kidnappers. As an adult, he became Carolina's so-called boyfriend. He also has a secret and complicated relationship with Victoria. He was strong and tough as a kid and as an adult he became Markado, a Mixed Martial Arts fighter and model. He will later find himself torn between Victoria and Gelai. He dies after helping Victoria discover the mystery that Gelai is her long lost sister Angela. Nash Aguas plays the younger counterpart.
Erich Gonzales as Chloe C. Abella – Vera and Manuel's adopted daughter. Chloe seeks her mother, Vera's attention but has never felt loved. She eventually develops special feelings for Caloy.
Enchong Dee as Carlo "Caloy" Javier – He is Gelai's supportive best friend but who is also in love with her. An unexpected turn of events will lead him to meet his perfect match, Chloe.

Recurring characters
Bianca Manalo as Gigi Fernando –  Gelai and Caloy’s close friend who also lives in the Divisoria complex.
Robert Arevalo as Ronaldo Valera –  Victoria’s adoptive father. He owns "The House of Ronaldo" and is one of the wealthiest people in the Philippines. He changed Anna’s name to Victoria upon making the decision to adopt her. Ronaldo became the only loving father figure in Victoria’s life.
Mark Gil as Manuel Abella –  Anna and Angela’s biological father, and Chloe’s adoptive father. As a young poor man, he left his wife, Stella and daughters Anna and Angela to pursue work in Milan. While in Milan, has an affair with Vera Cruz, a young model and aspiring designer. Upon his return to the Philippines, he decides to live and raise a family with Vera and ultimately leaves his wife and children. Unsuccessful at conceiving a child, Vera and Manuel adopt a daughter, Chloe, whom Manuel dotes on and Vera ignores. He dies after falling from the roof to save Gelai.
John Arcilla as Hermes Agustin – Gelai's adoptive father. He and his wife, Sonia, find the young and orphaned Gelai and decided to adopt her. He raised Gelai and loves and treats her as his own child.
Arlene Muhlach as Sonia Agustin – A seamstress, Hermes' wife, and Gelai's adoptive mother. She resents Gelai at first after having lost her own daughter previously, but eventually grows to love her as her own.
Beatriz Saw as Kate – Chloe's constant companion at the beginning of the series, and also works for Vera Cruz.
Nina Ricci Alagao as Donna – a fashion designer and businesswoman who works for Vera Cruz.
Irma Adlawan as Carolina –  She was Vera's loyal customer but is now Victoria's. Carolina is a notorious flirt and used to have a relationship with Louie.
R.S. Francisco as Gian Franco  – He is a senior fashion designer at Vera's Couture. He is Vera's right-hand man and is set to make Gelai's stay at the fashion house miserable.
Toffee Calma as John Paul - Gian Franco's assistant at Vera Couture.
Lyka Ugarte as Betsy – Victoria's nanny who stays with her and Ronaldo at their home.
Levi Ignacio as Oca – Louie's coach at the URCC, who also serves as an advising father figure in his life.
Rodjun Cruz as Calvin – Caloy's friend who is also a fighter that trains at URCC.

Guest cast
 Dimples Romana as Stella Abella
 Alessandra de Rossi as young Vera
 Kathryn Bernardo as Young Anna/Victoria
 Nash Aguas as young Louie/Dos
 Barbie Sabino as young Angela/Gelai
 James Blanco as young Manuel
 Allan Paule as young Ronaldo
 Maricar de Mesa as young Betsy
 Racquel Montessa as Mila Fernando
 Edward Mendez as Mark Laurel
 Christian Vasquez as Paul
 Irma Adlawan as Carolina
 RJ Ledesma as Christian Ocampo
 Will Devaughn as Nick
 Marc Abaya as Neil Olaguer
 Pinky Amador as Carmen Sotto
 Lorenzo Mara as Salvador
 Princess Manzon as Romina
 Bettina Carlos as Liz
 Josef Elizalde as Tommy
 Mia Pratts as Ruth
 Ian Galliguez as Cora
 Savannah Lamsen as Chloe
 Eric Waldie as Alexander Jacobs
 Karla Henry as Nicole Santos
 Phoemela Baranda as Reporter
 Marie Lozano as Reporter
 Cheska Litton as Reporter
 Manny Castañeda as Ronaldo's Friend
 Cheska Iñigo as Vera's Friend
 Ana Feleo as Doctor

Top fashion designers
Frederick Alba
Frederick Peralta
Rene Salud
Nat Manilag
Eric Delos Santos
Gerry Sunga
Ulysses King
Ann Ong
Gilda Salonga
Lorna Naval
Melissa Soriano
Puey Quiñones
Roland Lirio
Noel Crisostomo
Noli Gayanoche

References

Lists of drama television characters
Lists of Philippine television series characters